Solidago nana  is a North American plant species in the family Asteraceae, with the common names baby goldenrod and dwarf goldenrod. The species is native to deserts and mountainsides in the western United States, from the Rocky Mountains to the Great Basin in the states of Idaho, Montana, Nevada, Utah, Wyoming, Colorado, Arizona, and New Mexico.

Solidago nana is a perennial herb up to 50 cm (20 inches) tall, spreading by means of underground rhizomes. The leaves near the bottom of the stem are narrow, up to 10 cm (4 inches) long; leaves get progressively smaller higher up on the stem. One plant can produce as many as 100 small yellow flower heads in a large, flat-topped array at the top of the plant.

References

External links
Southwest Colorado Wildflowers

nana
Plants described in 1840
Flora of the Western United States
Flora without expected TNC conservation status